Runoff is a 2014 drama film written and directed by Kimberly Levin that centers on Betty Freeman (Kelly) and her attempts to save her family after the government threatens to foreclose on her country estate. It premiered at the 2014 Los Angeles Film Festival. Had a limited theatrical release by Monterey Media on July 25, 2015.

Cast 
Joanne Kelly – Betty
Neal Huff – Frank
Alex Shaffer – Finley
Tom Bower – Scratch
Kivlighan de Montebello – Sam
Darlene Hunt

Reception 
In the United States' review aggregator, the Rotten Tomatoes, in the score where the site staff categorizes the opinions of independent media and mainstream media only positive or negative, the film has an approval rating of 79% calculated based on 19 critics reviews. By comparison, with the same opinions being calculated using a weighted arithmetic mean, the score achieved is 7,6/10.

On another aggregator, Metacritic, which calculates review scores using only a weighted arithmetic average of certain outlets across most mainstream media, has a score of 64/100, achieved based on 9 press ratings attached to the site, with the indication of "generally favorable reviews".

In his review on IndieWire, James Rocchi rated it a B- saying it is a Winter's Bone on a farm "with a sharp-eyed, almost documentary eye on the realities and  everyday crimes of modern agribusiness". In Variety, Bill Edelstein said that director Kimberly Levin "gets naturalistic performances from all her actors, and tells her tale with a narrative economy that, despite the leisurely pace, never lingers too long in a scene".

See also 
 Surface runoff

References

External links 
 Official website
 
 Curator Films EFM-bound with 'Runoff'

2014 films
2010s English-language films
2014 drama films
American drama films
2010s American films